Lala, Nara, or Pokau is an Austronesian language of the central southern coast of the Papuan Peninsula in Papua New Guinea. This language is spoken in the villages of Oloi, Diumana, Ala'ala, Tubu, Kaiau and Vanuamae. A count in 2017 showed there to be about 3000 speakers with a current language status of developing, meaning that the language is in vigorous use, with literature in a standardized form being used by some.

According to Ethnologue the Lala language shares a 57% lexical similarity with the Toura language, and 47% with the Abadi language.

Culture 
The coastal surroundings of this land allows for vegetable farms and plenty of animals to be hunted, the wallaby being one notable example. The coast is also utilized for fishing.

Phonology

Vowels
The Lala language contrasts five vowel qualities. The front vowels are always short, while the back (or non-front) vowels are always long. Hence, the vowels are long , short , short , long , and long . Vowel pairs are au, ei, io, oe, oi, and ou.

Consonants
The following consonant phonemes are distinctive in the Lala language:

The fricative  only occurs in the words  'horse' and  'Hula people'. Introduced  can be heard in the name  and in  'ship'. Introduced  appears in  'boat'.

Stress
Stress usually falls on the second-to-last syllable of a word. It shifts when a syllable is added to a word. In some words no apparent stress can be heard, except in combination. The stress can also be altered when the word is shouted.

Morphology

Tense 
Simple present, simple past, and present continuous tenses marked on subject person markers. The markers a, o, ka, de, and e are placed after a noun to indicate these three tenses.

Remote past tense uses the marker .

Affixes
Object suffixes are often used with transitive verbs. Because the object pronoun usually comes in order after the subject pronoun, the object suffix is sometimes dropped without confusing the meaning. If the object pronoun comes first because of emphasis, the correct object suffix must be used to make the meaning clear.

The causative prefix  changes a root to a causative verb or noun. An example of this is  'to show', which is based on the root  'to look'.

The nominalizing prefix  changes words to nouns. An example of this is  'woven', from  'to weave'.

Modifiers
Negative modifiers are the general negator  'not',  'no', and  'not yet'. Verbal modifiers of manner and time are presented in the following two charts.

Possession
The Lala language distinguishes alienable from inalienable possession, the latter of which refers to relatives, parts of the body, and close extensions of the body.

Plural forms
Some nouns can be pluralized by reduplication. Examples of this are  'bird' and  'birds', and  'girl' and  'girls'.

There are exceptions to this rule, for example the reduplicated word  'woman' is singular, while the corresponding plural form is simpler  'women'.

Syntax 

The basic constituent order in most sentences follows the structure subject–object–verb.

Clause types

The following clause types can be distinguished:

 Purpose clause e.g.  'We went to the town to buy a truck.' In this sentence the stated purpose is to buy a truck.
 Reason clause e.g.  'Work hard lest your father get cross.' In this sentence the reason is to avoid the father's getting cross.
 Coordinate clause e.g.  'Go and help your mother.' In this sentence the two actions of going and helping your mother are conjoined.
 Time clause e.g.  'After the rain stops we'll go hunting.' The important word to note in this sentence is 'after'. The use of the word 'after' makes the listener know when the action can or should take place.

References

Notes

Sources

Central Papuan Tip languages
Languages of Central Province (Papua New Guinea)